Jean Bertholle (26 June 1909, Dijon – 6 December 1996, Paris) was a French painter of the new Paris School.

1909 births
1996 deaths
20th-century French painters
20th-century French male artists
French male painters
Artists from Dijon
Members of the Académie des beaux-arts